This is a list of notable members of Beta Theta Pi fraternity.

Academia

Community organizations

Government and politics

Arts, entertainment, and media

Sports

Military

Business

Astronauts

References

Sources
 Brown, James T., ed., Catalogue of Beta Theta Pi, New York: 1917.

Beta Theta Pi
members